The U.S. Post Office and Courthouse is a post office and federal courthouse located at 200 North Eighth Street in Quincy, Illinois. The building was designed in 1885 and completed in 1887. Architect Mifflin E. Bell, Supervising Architect at the time, designed the French Renaissance Revival style building. Bell's design was inspired by Richard Morris Hunt's design for the William K. Vanderbilt House in New York City; at the time, the French Renaissance Revival style had not spread to Illinois, which made Bell's work distinctive in the region. The building's design features a limestone exterior, arched entrances and first-floor windows, and an ornate roof with pointed gables and dormers.

The building, also known as the Orville H. Browning Station, was listed on the National Register of Historic Places on December 2, 1977.

See also 

List of United States federal courthouses in Illinois
List of United States post offices

References

External links 
National Register nomination

National Register of Historic Places in Adams County, Illinois
Government buildings completed in 1887
Post office buildings in Illinois
Courthouses on the National Register of Historic Places in Illinois
Post office buildings on the National Register of Historic Places in Illinois
Courthouses in Illinois
Buildings and structures in Quincy, Illinois
Former federal courthouses in the United States